George Woodruff Hull (June 6, 1870 – April 6, 1951) was an American farmer and politician.

Born in the town of Johnstown, Rock County, Wisconsin, Hull went to public school. He then went to Lawrence University. He was born and raised on a farm. Hull was president of the Wisconsin Farm Bureau Federation and the Wisconsin Foreign Cheese Federation. Hull served as town  board chairman. He also served on the Rock County, Wisconsin Board of Supervisors and was chairman of the county board. In 1923, Hull moved to Whitewater, Wisconsin. He served in the Wisconsin State Senate and was a Republican. Hull died in Janesville, Wisconsin as a result of a fall.

Notes

External links

1870 births
1951 deaths
People from Rock County, Wisconsin
People from Whitewater, Wisconsin
Lawrence University alumni
Farmers from Wisconsin
Mayors of places in Wisconsin
County supervisors in Wisconsin
Republican Party Wisconsin state senators
Accidental deaths in Wisconsin